Aref Arefkia, known as Aref (also Romanized as Āref, born August 10, 1940) is an Iranian pop music singer and former actor. He is known as "The king of hearts" and "The legend of pop" in Iran.

He graduated from Tehran Industrial School of Art in 1958. Before starting his career as a singer, Aref worked as a teacher in Qazvin industrial school of art for two years, but the truth is that he has been singing since he was 12 years old.

In the 1960s, Aref introduced a new wave of romantic styles to the large spectrum of romantic Persian music. After the Islamic revolution Aref left Iran and went to London and Los Angeles. He has one son and four daughters.

His first hit was "Daryacheye Noor" which is still popular among all the Iranians. Aref and his family left Iran in 1979, following the Islamic revolution. He first lived in London, England, for three years, then moved to Los Angeles, United States.

Number of songs : I present you (August 2018), that's enough (June 2018), Peshmerga (February 2017), who better than you (November 2016), Love (July 2016), Bagh-e Darya (February 2016), Mondgar (December 2015), Don't Cry (January 1, 2015), Song of Nostalgia (June 2014), Love (May 19, 2014), Storm (October 1, 2013), Aramesh (2012), If you're not (with Reza Naderi- 2011), Stars, Fire (2007), Persian Gulf.

Song Style: In the past,  Aref's work was known among music pursuers as "Aref style.". The process of shaping this style was as follows:
In the mid-1940s, songs were performed as ballads that had Arabic themes and were mostly needles and gloomy. The course was attended by singers Qasim Jebeli, Manouchehr Shafiee, Alfred Lazarian and Houshang Shokati. Some poets and translators translated the lyrics of the European song "Wow to Wow". Hamid Ghanbari and Jamshid Sheibani were among the first to perform the translated lyrics with the same original song. This style was pop, but it was not Iranian. In the early 1950s, love songs were performed with Western orchestration and Persian theology. This style of songs was presented to the public by Mohammad Noori, Vigen and Manouchehr Sakhaei. 

When Aref started his career, Viguen was referred to as the "founder of pop music". He was able to create a "Aref style" by adding Iranian melodies and musical instruments to the previous style.

The concept of songs : 

Love Songs : Aref had suffered many hardships in his life, so there was a "disdain" in his voice. His loneliness also made the songs he sang more palpable to the listener, and the sense of the song conveyed well. This was lost by performing the song "Lake of Light (= Daryache ye Noor)",  and he had to use his thoughts to create it in his songs to create sense. (Aref never used smoke or alcohol) Shahbal Shab-pareh wrote in  "The Pop Fader song" about Aref: "The Sultan(=King) of Hearts was Aref, reading it was for the heart of love. Everything he read smelled of love , promising , friendship and compromise" 

Political and Patriotic Songs : 
With the outbreak of the revolution, Aref tried to distance himself from singing love songs and sing about the pains of the people of his community. During his time in the country, he performed the songs of "brother (=baradar)" and "I will give you my hands (= dast hayam raa be to midaham)" . 

Abroad, songs such as "My Pulse for Iran (=nabze man baraye Iran mizane)" , "People Always people (=mardom hamishe mardom)" , "Little Soldier (=sarbaz kochoolo)" , "Blackout (=khaamooshi)" , "Strange Days of Nazanin(= roozegare ajibist nazanin)" , "Beman Madar" , "khakeh man Irane man Koo", "Anthem of Iran (Polyphony)", "Persian Gulf(=khalije fars)" , "Beat the Fire(= bezan atash)" released.

New Persian Songs : In the early 1970s, great songwriters such as Shahyar Ghanbari, Ardalan Sarfaraz and Iraj Jannati-Ataei began to change the course of songs and used heavy Persian literature. These types of poets were like unknown 2-3 equations that led the listener astray. Aref sought to perform simple poets that would be tangible to the listener. Like the song "I Don't Believe (=delam bavar nadareh)" with a poem by Shahyar Ghanbari that was performed in the mid-1960s : [ I know, like everyone else, you'll be fed up with me, and you'll be saddened by my grief / These two white hands in my hand, I know, will eventually put my hand back / I know, but I don't believe it's enough that it's simple, it brings me bad back ]

Polyphony Songs : 

1. Duet with female singers :In addition to Narmela and Pouran and Delkash, Ramesh, Googoosh, Ahdieh, Beheshteh, Shahin, Hayedeh, Pouran Zandi (wife of Jamshid Zandi ), Aref also performed duets that were mostly made for feature films. 

In the 1960s and 1970s, most of the selway choruses of Aref songs were performed by a woman named Hermineh. In 2002, Aref appeared as a guest singer at the Kodak Theatre and performed the song "Sultan of Hearts (=sultane qalbha)" along with Leila Forouhar.

Duet  male singers :

The songs that Aref performed with male singers are:  Advice (with Amir Rasaei), Roses (with Sattar), Iran Iraneh (with Shahram Kashani) and If you're not (with Reza Naderi). In late 1991, at an art festival, baron baron, kalaghha, and Hala kheili direh, they were co-performed by Viguen, Manouchehr Sakhaei and Aref .

Four-voiced songs (related to the film Money of the World(= donyaye pool) :Several songs were recorded for this film, composer and arranger Anoushirvan Rouhani, whose words were written by Karim Fakoor. In the film, two songs, "Del-e Qafel" and "Dastet Ra dar dasteh man deh", were recorded and performed in the voices of Aref, Vigen, Pouran and Beheshteh .

The four-voiced song "Parastooha" (related to the movie The Lovely Girl(=Dookhtareh eshvehgar) : The song was recorded and released along with Ahadieh, Alice and Bella .

Triphony song "Hamoumi": The folk song was set in 1974 by Shamaezadeh, played by Aref, Ebi and Solly. The song was also performed and released by Shama-ei-zadeh, Martik and Bahram. 

Six-voiced songs related to Nowruz 1978: In one of the television specials, two songs , "Samanoo" and "Ey Ensan" were performed by Aref, Solly, Betty, Nelly, Nasrin and Faramarz Parsi. 

Six-voiced song "Iran" (Vatan janeh man_jaanam Irane man): The song was produced and released in 1988 with a poem by Homayoun Hoshyarnejad and a song by Shamaei-zadeh in a shortcoming called "Peace(=Solh)" by Pars Video, whose singers were Aref, Vigen, Shamaei-zadeh, Hooshmand Aghili and Shifteh. 

"Nobahar" nine-voiced song: Performed by Aref, Vigen, Sattar, Leila Forouhar, Morteza, Andy, Koros and Delaram and Fataneh.

Eight-voiced song "Haji-Firouz": Performed by Aref, Vigen, Shama'izadeh, Fataneh, Hassan Shojaei, Nahid, Andy and Koros. 

The 12-voiced song "khake-man Irane-man koo": Performed by Aref, Sattar, Habib, Hooshmand Aghili, Shahrokh Shaheed, Morteza Barjaste, Ali Nazari, Ahmad Azad, Nazi Afshar, Sadegh Nojooki, Delaram and Shahla Sarshar. 

Song "Music": The song was recorded in collaboration with 24 Iranian artists produced by Tapesh-TV in 2006. The songwriter was Paksima Zakipour and her composer and arranger by Ramon. Featured Songs : 1. Burning and Instrument (=sooro-saze): The song is the result of Arif's collaboration with Parviz Maqsadi, which marked a turning point in his fame. Aref says: "Early on, I sang every song I was offered, but later I decided not to play a song that didn't sit in my heart. That's why I tried my best to sing my favorite songs, and the beginning of these songs was "Burning and Instrument", which was welcomed by everyone. Elusive shadow (=Saaye-gorizan): The song was released in 1967 and topped the best-selling songs for weeks. The elusive shadow is based on a song by "I saw her standing there" , whose rhythm has been transformed from two-fourth to six-eighth, and is played in the style of the "Beatles" with three guitars. The song's composer was Parviz Khatibi, who helped Aref and Zaven Ohanian (the arranger of the work) to transform the rhythm. "Lake of Light (=Daryache-Noor)": The song was performed and released in 1968 with a beautiful melody by Parviz Maqsadi. "Daryache-Noor" was ranked second in the best song of 1968 by the singers of "Majale-Javanan" ( famous Iranian journal ), which made Aref more popular. Aref's sense of satisfaction was so much that he forgot about his sadly-voice. Aref says: "When the song "Daryache-Noor" was very muddy, Vigen also went to a destination to compose a song at this level, and he wrote "Gole-sorkh", which was highly regarded.

Discography
Aref recalls to have sung up to 850 songs to this date. After the Islamic Revolution of 1979, In Los Angeles and Dubai he produced many albums: 
 Various Singers: Gol-e Sorkh 1993
 Various Singers: Khaaneh Sorkh 
 Baazgasht 1983
 Sarbaz Kouchouloo 2002
 Roozegar-e Gharibist Nazanin 1989
 Ayeneh dar Ayeneh 1995
 Khoda Kone Biyaee 1996
 Khaaneh Sorkh 
 Various Singers: Solh 
 Piri (Aref's old hits that were all re-mastered)
 Mard-e Ghabileh 1991
 Mah o Palang 1996
 Nazak 1985
 Soltan-e Ghalbha (Aref's old hits that were all re-mastered) 1999
 Amineh 2000
 Gharib Anaam(Azari)
 VasiyatNameh 1998
 Aziz-e Ghesseh(not yet released)
 Alma(Azari) 2011
 50 Years Greatest Hits (5 CDs):
This package has 60 of Aref's hits:
 Tranquilzer Songs-1
 Breezy Songs-1
 Breezy Songs-2
 Tranquilzer Songs-2
 Breezy Songs-3

Success and awards 
Aref received many awards, including the Highest Cultural Imperial Medallion from the Shah, Mohammad Reza Pahlavi, for singing at the Asian Games of 1974 in Iran. In this concert with Tehran's Philharmonic Orchestra, Aref sang in front of 100,000 Iranians and in the presence of many international state officials and dignitaries.

Aref performed his first concert outside of Iran in New York City in Madison Square to commemorate the 200th anniversary of the American Independence.

His success continued well into the mid-1970s. In a survey conducted by Javanan Magazine, Aref and Googoosh were both chosen as "Most Famous Pop Icon" of the year, nine years in a row.

Zan-e Rooz magazine chose Aref as Man of the Year from a large group of politicians, singers and actors.

Filmography 
Aref was also a popular singer for movie soundtracks (about 60 movies). His songs were heard on numerous Iranian films of the 1960s and early 1970s among which Gholam Jandarm, Soltan-e Ghalbha, Ghesseh-e Shab, Yaghout-e 3 Chashm, Dalahoo and Gharibeh are the most famous. He also appeared in six different musical films:

1. Ezdevaj e Irani (1966)
2. EshghAfarin (1967)
3. Saaghi (1968)
4. Ayene e Zaman (1968)
5. Ghorboon e Harchi Khoshgele (1971)
6. Bezan Berim (1974)

References

External links

 Aref Arefkia Official Website
 Iran Chamber Society www.iranchamber.com
 Sheet Music of songs by Aref

1941 births
Living people
People from Tehran
Iranian pop singers
Singers from Tehran
Iranian male singers
Iranian Azerbaijanis
Caltex Records artists
Taraneh Records artists
Iranian male film actors
Iranian singer-songwriters
20th-century Iranian male singers
Iranian emigrants to the United States